WZBB (99.9 FM) is a Country-formatted radio station licensed to Stanleytown, Virginia, serving the Rocky Mount/Martinsville area.  WZBB is owned and operated by Turner Media Group, Inc.

History
The station first took the callsign WZBB on February 15, 1989, and officially launched a month later in March. For two and a half years, the station would carry an Adult Contemporary format, branded as "B-99.9". At midnight on December 31, 1991, WZBB switched to Country, keeping the "B-99.9" branding, and using the slogan "Today's Hot Country". In October 2006, the branding was changed to "Super Country 99.9; The Greatest Hits of All Time". On March 1, 2019, the station reverted to its original branding, "B-99.9; Southern Virginia's Country Station".

References

External links
 B 99-9 Online
 

ZBB
Country radio stations in the United States
Radio stations established in 1989
1989 establishments in Virginia